The progressive theory of capital is an economic theory posited by Léon Walras in 1874 in part 5 of his book Elements of Pure Economics.

See also
 Capital (economics)
 Capital goods
 Capital services
 Capital stocks
 Walras-Cassel System
 Walrasian General Equilibrium Theory
 Capital and Investment Theory
 Léon Walras

References

Further reading
 E. Barone (1895) "Sopra un Libro del Wicksell", Giornale degli Economisti, Vol. 11, p. 524-39.
 J.v. Daal and A. Jolink (1993) The Equilibrium Economics of Léon Walras. London: Routledge.
W. Jaffé (1942) "Léon Walras' Theory of Capital Accumulation", in O. Lange, F. McIntyre and O. Yntema, editors, Studies in Mathematical Economics and Econometrics. Chicago: University of Chicago Press.
T. Kompas (1992) Studies in the History of Long-Run Equilibrium Theory. Manchester, UK: Manchester University Press.
D.A. Walker (1996) Walras's Market Models. Cambridge, UK: Cambridge University Press.
L. Walras (1874) Elements of Pure Economics: Or the theory of social wealth. 1954 translation of 1926 edition, Homewood, Ill.: Richard Irwin.
K. Wicksell (1893) Value, Capital and Rent. 1970 reprint of 1954 edition, New York: Augustus M. Kelley.

External links
 Walras's Progressive Theory of Capital

Microeconomic theories